István Szendeffy (29 November 1899 – 21 August 1985) was a Hungarian rower. He competed in the men's coxed four event at the 1924 Summer Olympics.

References

External links
 

1899 births
1985 deaths
Hungarian male rowers
Olympic rowers of Hungary
Rowers at the 1924 Summer Olympics
Rowers from Budapest